Delias duris is a butterfly in the family Pieridae. It was described by William Chapman Hewitson in 1861. It is found in the Australasian realm, where it is only known from Ceram Island, Indonesia.

The wingspan is about 60 mm. Adults may be distinguished from similar species by the hindwing having the discal area red, and the forewing cell yellow.

References

External links
Delias at Markku Savela's Lepidoptera and Some Other Life Forms

duris
Butterflies described in 1861
Butterflies of Indonesia
Taxa named by William Chapman Hewitson